Vigilant Fire Company Firemen's Monument is a historic monument located at Washington Township, Lehigh County, Pennsylvania.  

It was added to the National Register of Historic Places in 2004.

History
Erected in 1909 and dedicated on September 16, 1909, the Vigilant Fire Company Fireman's Monument is a 16-foot-high granite monument on a concrete base, which is situated on a plot of land chosen by the fire company for its visibility from the highway. Crafted by local stone mason Frank Scheirer at a cost of $2,200, the monument incorporates a 7-foot-tall statue of an early 20th-century fireman with a handlebar mustache, pointed fire hat, fire coat and boots, and holding a young girl in both arms. Arthur Scranton, a member of the Vigilant Fire Company, was responsible for the erection of the monument, according to the monument's dedication plaque.

This monument was added to the National Register of Historic Places in 2004.

Burials
Initially planned as a burial site for firemen who had been facing financial hardships or were without family at their respective times of death, the proposed usage of the plot where the monument is located was expanded to allow for the burial of career and volunteer firemen. Three firemen who were interred here are (see gravestone photo gallery below): Harry J. Henritzy. Marcus Hessman, and Theodore Hoffman.

Gallery

See also
 List of firefighting monuments and memorials

References

External links
 Vigilant Fire Company Fireman's Monument (photo with text). Slatington, Pennsylvania: Wilkes-Barre Township Fire Department, July 28, 2018.</ref>

Firefighting memorials
Monuments and memorials on the National Register of Historic Places in Pennsylvania
Buildings and structures completed in 1909
Buildings and structures in Lehigh County, Pennsylvania
Monuments and memorials in Pennsylvania
National Register of Historic Places in Lehigh County, Pennsylvania